Dalmas is a 1973 Australian film directed by Bert Deling. One critic wrote that "with Dave Jones’ Yackety Yack [the film] constitutes the clearest presence of Godard in Australian cinema."

Plot
An ex-cop, Pete Dalmas, is pursuing a drug runner Mr Big. He visits another ex-cop, Rojack, who has become a drug addict. Rojack gives him a lead to a drug dealer called the Plastic Man. He follows the Plastic Man to a seaside camp and the film turns into a film about the making of the film, with the director and actors discussing filmmaking and drugs.

Cast
Peter Whittle as Dalmas
Peter Cummins as Plastic Man
Max Gillies as Rojack
John Duigan as film director
Roger Ward as policeman
Tribe

Production
The film was shot over four years. Half the budget was provided by the Experimental Film and Television Fund.

Many people who worked on it were associated with the Pram Factory Theatre in Melbourne.

Release
The movie was not widely screened however it was given a commercial season at the Australia Twin Cinema in Melbourne.

References

External links
Dalmas at IMDb
'Dalmas: A milestone in Australian Psychedelic Cinema'
Dalmas at BFI
Dalmas at Oz Movies

Australian drama films
1970s English-language films
1973 films
1973 drama films
Films directed by Bert Deling
1970s Australian films